Christopher Kerber (born July 23, 1968) is an American lightweight rower. He won a gold medal at the 1993 World Rowing Championships in Račice with the lightweight men's four. Kerber is currently the Head Coach of Lightweight Rowing at Cornell University, along with Assistant Head Coach Bill Brumstead, and has been there since the 2008 season. Prior to Cornell, Kerber coached in numerous programs, including a coaching job with LaSalle College High School in Philadelphia. Kerber's lightweight varsity eights won the Intercollegiate Rowing Association (IRA) national championship in 2014, 2015, 2017, and 2019. His teams won the Jope Cup in 2014 and 2015.

References

1968 births
Living people
American male rowers
World Rowing Championships medalists for the United States
Pan American Games medalists in rowing
Pan American Games gold medalists for the United States
Cornell Big Red rowing coaches
Rowers at the 1991 Pan American Games
Rowers at the 1995 Pan American Games